The Athletics Federation of India (AFI) is the national governing body for Athletics sport in India, and is responsible for conducting competitions in the country. It was formed in 1943. It is affiliated to World Athletics and Asian Athletics Association (AAA).

It was formerly called as Amateur Athletic Federation of India (AAFI). Anju Bobby George an Indian Olympian was appointed as the vice president of AFI.

History
Athletics Federation of India, then Amateur Athletic Federation of India (AAFI), was formed in 1946 at the initiative of Prof. G.D. Sondhi and Maharaja Yadvindra Singh. Prof. G.D. Sondhi was its first President for a short while, resigning on 13 April 1950.

Competitions

AFI organises following national level Athletics competitions annually, periodically in the country:

 National Federation Cup Senior Athletics Competition
 Indian Open Reacewalking competition 
 Indian Open Javelin throw competition
 National Federation Cup under-20 Athletics championships 
 National Inter-state senior Athletics championships 
 National Javelin Throw Competition  
 North Zone Junior Athletics championship 
 Indian open 400m competition
 South zone junior Athletics championship 
 West zone junior Athletics championship
 East zone junior Athletics championship
 National youth Athletics championship
 National open athletics championship 
 Indian open Under 23 Athletics competition
 National junior Athletics championship
 National Inter-district junior Athletics meet. 
 Source -

Controversies
AFI has been under pressure for the last several years due to doping scandals. The entire  women's relay that won gold in the 2010 Commonwealth Games were tested positive for anabolic steroid.

The governing body's selection process for international teams have received public criticism. PU Chitra, Ajay Kumar Saroj and Sudha Singh were excluded from the 2017 World Championships in Athletics despite being eligible for entry by the International Association of Athletics Federations (the global governing body). Chitra lodged an appeal to the Kerala High Court in July 2017, though she was ultimately excluded as the court's request for inclusion was beyond the selection cut-off date. Commentator KP Mohan believed the right decision had been made to not include Chitra and several other Asian champions, given their low international ranking at that time, though he stated the controversy could have been avoided if the AFI had made its selection criteria clear before the start of the athletics season.

Footnotes

See also
 Sports in India – Overview of sports in India

References

External links
 AFI web site
 Competition Manual

Athletics in India
Sports governing bodies in India
National members of the Asian Athletics Association
Sports organizations established in 1946
1946 establishments in India